"A Dónde" is a 1989 single by German synth-pop band Cetu Javu. The song was released as a single in Spain and appeared on their 1990 debut album Southern Lands. The extended version originally featured as the B-side to "So Strange". A new 12" remix version b/w "Una Mujer" was released in 1993. Mexican band Sentidos Opuestos recorded a cover version of the song which was included on their 1997 album Viviendo del Futuro.

Track listings

7" vinyl
 Basic Mix / BASIS - 021

1993 12" single
 SPA: Modermusic EP.1003 M

References

1989 songs
1989 singles
Cetu Javu songs